Lost Song is a musical fantasy anime television series produced by Liden Films in collaboration with Dwango and Mages. The series follows Rin and Finis, two girls with opposite backgrounds and personalities yet sharing the commonality of performing miraculous songs worthy of healing, wind, water and fire. Rin and Finis each embark on an arduous journey during a time of war in the kingdom, and they must find each other in order to sing a duet that will restore world peace once again. The series was first released online in Japan through Netflix on March 31, 2018, followed by a TV airing on Tokyo MX, SUN, TVA, BS Fuji and KBS on April 7, 2018. Netflix began streaming the series globally on September 30, 2018.


Episode list

References

External links
 

Lost Song